Tim Arvier is an Australian journalist. He is currently the state political and investigative reporter, and a fill-in presenter, for Nine News Queensland. He was previously North American and European correspondent for Nine News, a reporter on Nine News Darwin and a Queensland reporter for A Current Affair.

Career
Arvier obtained business and journalism degrees from the University of Queensland and early in his career worked casually in the Nine Network Brisbane newsroom before moving to Darwin where he became a reporter and fill-in presenter for Nine News. He then became the Nine Network's Europe correspondent where he covered events ranging from Samantha Stosur's run to the 2010 French Open final to the disappearance of Madeleine McCann. He has also been a reporter on Nine News Perth.

In 2011, Arvier returned to Queensland where he became a reporter on A Current Affair. In March 2014, Arvier was attacked by a Gold Coast pastor while covering a story about the pastor who had admitted to engaging in inappropriate behaviour with women.

In May 2016, Arvier moved to Los Angeles where he became the Nine Network's US correspondent, covering major events such as the death of Muhammad Ali and Donald Trump's victory in the 2016 United States presidential campaign.

In May 2017, Arvier returned to Brisbane where he became a reporter for Nine News Queensland.

In August 2017, while on assignment in Korea covering the standoff between North Korea and the United States over the rogue state's missile testing, Arvier was in the middle of a live cross to Nine's Melbourne afternoon news bulletin when it had to be shut down upon the arrival of a South Korean soldier. Arvier and the camera crew were detained for 20 minutes following the incident, after which they were escorted from the area where the live cross was conducted and released without charge.

In June 2019, Arvier was appointed North American correspondent for Nine News, replacing Robert Penfold who recently retired from the network. In May 2020, he provided on-site eyewitness reports from the unfolding Twin Cities riots arising from the murder of George Floyd in Minneapolis for Today and Nine News, for which he won several awards at the 2020 Queensland Clarion Awards, including the Journalist of the Year. At one point during coverage of the riots, Arvier and television crew were detained by police in the city, but were later released without charge.

In January 2021, Arvier returned to Brisbane as a reporter for Nine News Queensland.

References

Australian people of German descent
Australian people of Italian descent
Australian reporters and correspondents
Australian television journalists
Living people
Nine News presenters
University of Queensland alumni
Year of birth missing (living people)
People from Brisbane